Dimitrios Bogris (1890 Salamis Island - 1964 Athens) was a famous Greek playwright of Hellenic theater. He was born in Salamis Island in 1890. He studied in Athens and Paris natural sciences. For one year was professor in secondary education, but rapidly he devoted with the journalism .

His first play, was the giatros Mavridis  (doctor Mavridis) and ascended to the Greek theatrical scene in 1921, in the royal Hellenic theatre. Four years later wrote the  Arravoniasmata ( Engagements ), which was played in 1936 . With this play was proved one of the greatest playwrights of Greece .

Other plays were : Drakaina ( Ogress ) in 1928, to Bourini ( the Squall ) in 1933, i Kainourgia zoi ( the New lIfe ) in 1936, oi Fouskothalassies ( the Ground swells ) in 1937, to Koritsi tou limaniou ( the Girl of port ) in 1947, which became movie and screened by Greek Cinema in 1952 .
He died in Athens in 1964 .
The former mayor of Salamis Athanasios Makris, named a chamber of Salamis City Hall with the name of Dimitrios Mpogris .

19th-century births
1951 deaths
National and Kapodistrian University of Athens alumni
20th-century Greek dramatists and playwrights
Writers from Athens